Charles Sumption (15 March 1910 – October 1988) was an Indian cricketer. He played one first-class match for Bengal in 1941/42.

See also
 List of Bengal cricketers

References

External links
 

1910 births
1988 deaths
Indian cricketers
Bengal cricketers
People from Kanpur